Chudamani Vihara was a Buddhist vihara (monastery) in Nagapattinam, Tamil Nadu, India. Chudamani Vihara was constructed in 1006 CE by the Srivijayan king Sri Vijaya Maravijayattungavarman with the patronage of Rajaraja Chola I. The vihara building survived in dilapidated condition. Since 1856, about 350 Buddha bronzes have been found at  Nagapattinam, dating from the 11th to the 16th century.

History
The heritage of Nagapattinam is mentioned in the Burmese historical text of 3rd century B.C. which mentions a Buddha vihara built by the emperor Ashoka. The Chinese traveler Xuanzang also mentioned the vihara. Nagappattinam is mentioned as Padarithitha in the ancient Buddhist literature. 

The Anaimangalam copperplate of Kulothunga Chola I mentions that  Kasiba Thera (Buddhist Monk) renovated the shrine in 6th century AD with the help of monks of "Naganadu" (Nagapattinam). The Pallava King Rajasimha (690–728) permitted a Chinese king to build Buddha vihara in Nagappattinam.

According to the copperplate record of Chola king Rajaraja, the Sailendra king, Sri Mara-vijayottunga-varman constructed the vihara with the support of Rajaraja.

It is written in Ponniyin Selvan by Kalki that the copperplate was moved to Leiden Museum (Holland).

One statue, now at John D. Rockefeller Collection of Asian Art in New York, has an inscription that mentions that this Buddha was created to be carried in a procession during the temple’s sacred festival. The inscription has been translated by Vidya Dehejia as:

Well-being [and] prosperity. The nayakar [Buddha], of all of the eighteen countries, of the metalworkers. The procession image, for the sacred festival of the alvar temple, which was caused to be taken in procession by the respected one (utaiyar) endowed of the four gunas from Cirutavur; [in] the perum-palli (great place of worship or great vihara) of the metalworkers, [in] the perum-palli of Rajendra Chola.

Notes

 The Chudamani Vihara was demolished by a tsunami a while after the visit of The Chinese traveler Xuanzang

References

External links
  Buddha 14th century Formerly in the collection of Mrs. W. van Hoogstraten-Fetlaer, Netherlands.
   Bodhi's Tamil Afterglow Outlook India, 7 July 2004  
  Nagapattinam Buddhas at the Chennai Museum
 Buddha Shakyamuni Norton Simon Museum
  Buddha Shakyamuni Art Institute of Chicago
  procession Buddha John D. Rockefeller Collection of Asian Art in New York
  Buddha, 12th century Art Institute of Chicago
  Tracing the Sri Lanka-Kerala link Hindustan Times 23 March 2006

Defunct Buddhist monasteries
Buddhist monasteries in India
History of Tamil Nadu
Buddhism amongst Tamils